The 2021 P. League+ draft was the first edition of the draft. Originally scheduled to be held online on July 21, 2021 and broadcast on YouTube and Facebook, the P. League+ announced on July 2, 2021, that the draft would be postponed until July 22, 2021 due to the scheduling conflicts with Women's Super Basketball League draft.

Draft selections

Notable undrafted players
These players were not selected in the 2021 P. League+ draft, but have played at least one game in the P. League+.

Trades involving draft picks

Entrants

Local

Cao Li-Zhong – F, NKNU
Chen Cheng-Hsuan – F, CCUT
Chen Chun-Nan – G, NTSU
Chen Po-Hung – G, CCUT
Chen Xiao-Yu – G, ISU
Chen Yi-Lun – G, NTSU
Chen Yu-Wei – G, NTNU
Cheng Te-Wei – F, SHU
Chiu Chia-You – F, NKNU
Chiu Chung-Po – F, ISU
Chu En-Lin – F, NTUS
Chu Yun-Hao – F, UCH
Chuang Yu-Chi – F, PCCU
Hung Kai-Chieh – G, NCCU
Jhao De-En – F, FJU
Lan Shao-Fu – C, NTSU
Lee Mo-Fan – F, NTUS
Lin Chun-En – G, UT
Lin Jyun-Hao – F, NTUA
Lin Shih-Hsuan – G, NTNU
Lin Tzu-Feng – G, UCH
Liu Chun-Ting – F, UCH
Liu Hung-Po – F, NKNU
Liu Rui-Xiang – G, NPTU
Liu Shyen-Yu – G, Magee SS
Su Chih-Cheng – G, NTSU
Syu Shih-Hong – F, LYHS
Tao Jyun – F, NTSU
Tseng Yu-Hao – F, NCCU
Wang Chen-Yuan – G, NCCU
Wang Hong-Hao – G, UT
Wang Hsin-Wei – G, VNU
Wang Lu-Hsiang – G, CCUT
Wang Wei-Cheng – G, NKNU
Yang Jun-Jie – F, UT
Yu Chia-Sheng – F, NPTU
Yuan Jia-Lo – G, FJU
Zhou Zong-Hao – G, NPTU

Overseas Chinese

 Peter Guinchard – G, Cran Pringy Basket
 Matthew Yang – G, Taichung Dreamers Academy

Foreign student

 Austin Derrick – C, UCH
 Omar Niang – C, NCCU

References

External links
Official site

Draft
P. League+ draft
P. League+ lists
July 2021 sports events in Asia
2021 in Taiwanese sport